NGC 6334, colloquially known as the Cat's Paw Nebula, Bear Claw Nebula, or Gum 64, is an emission nebula and star-forming region located in the constellation Scorpius. NGC 6334 was discovered by astronomer John Herschel in 1837, who observed it from the Cape of Good Hope in South Africa.

The nebula is a high mass filamentary cloud structure spanning .
In the visible part of the spectrum, it emits mainly in red (from hydrogen atoms) and blue (from oxygen atoms). Several embedded star-forming regions have been identified from infrared and radio emissions. Four of these sites have formed H II regions.

Gallery

References

External links

 On the Trail of a Cosmic Cat — ESO Photo Release

Astronomy Picture of the Day - Wide Angle: The Cat's Paw Nebula 2010 April 21
 Cat's Paw Nebula at Constellation Guide

Emission nebulae
Star-forming regions
6334
Sharpless objects
Scorpius (constellation)
Articles containing video clips
Astronomical objects discovered in 1837